is a Japanese actress, model and former idol. She is represented by the talent agency Amuse, Inc. and from 2010 to 2012 was a member of the agency's girl group Sakura Gakuin.

Discography 
 For Ayaka Miyoshi's discography as a member of Sakura Gakuin and its subunit Scoopers, see Sakura Gakuin discography.

Filmography

Film

Television dramas

Variety 
  (14 October 2011 – 7 September 2012, TV Tokyo)
  (11 October 2014 – 14 October 2017, NTV) — Host

Commercials 
 Appeared in over 20 television commercials.

Music videos 
 Kagrra —  (14 February 2007)

 DEPARTURES — by the band Globe. The video was released on May 3, 2016, 20 years after the band released the song.

 Won't Cry -  by Jay Chou and Mayday vocalist, Ashin (16 September 2019)

Awards 
 67th Mainichi Film Award (awarded in 2013 for 2012) — Sponichi Grand Prix Newcomer Award (for Gumo Ebian!)
 35th Yokohama Film Festival (awarded in 2014) — Best Newcomer Award (for Tabidachi no Uta: Jugo no Haru and Gumo Ebian!)

References

External links 
 Ayaka Miyoshi's official profile at Amuse, Inc. 
 Ayaka Miyoshi's official blog on Ameblo 
 

1996 births
Living people
Japanese female idols
Japanese child actresses
Japanese female models
Japanese women pop singers
Sakura Gakuin members
People from Kawagoe, Saitama
Musicians from Saitama Prefecture
Amuse Inc. talents
Japanese film actresses
Japanese television actresses
21st-century Japanese actresses